Mostafa Gaafar (born 3 April 1981) is an Egyptian footballer.

Career
He transferred from Baladeyet Al-Mahalla and has shown his brilliant dribbling ability and calm finishing, prompting Egyptian National team coach Hassan Shehata to call him up to the national team. Gaafar has claimed he had not been given enough playing time and threatened to leave Zamalek if he did not get a chance to show his ability.

Honors

with Zamalek
Egyptian Cup (2008)

References

External links

Egyptian footballers
Egypt international footballers
Al Masry SC players
Zamalek SC players
1981 births
Living people
Sportspeople from Port Said
Egyptian Premier League players
Association football forwards